Igor Janusev (born November 13, 1983) is a Macedonian politician. He is former General Secretary of VMRO-DPMNE from 2018-2020. and former the Head of General Affairs Department Ministry of Transport and Communications of the Republic of Macedonia from 2007 to 2015.

Early life and education
In 2006, Janusev graduated from the "Justinian Primus" Faculty of Law of Ss. Cyril and Methodius University of Skopje - In following year, he did his postgraduate studies at the International Law and International Relations in Skopje.

Career
He serves in Ministry of Transport and Communications in 2007 - 2015,
He serves as General Director of the Public Transport Company "SKOPJE" - Skopje (JSP) in 2015 - 2017

References

1983 births
Living people
People from Veles, North Macedonia
VMRO-DPMNE politicians
Ss. Cyril and Methodius University of Skopje alumni
Members of the Assembly of North Macedonia